The ROH World Championship is a professional wrestling world championship owned by the Ring of Honor (ROH) promotion. The championship was created and debuted on July 27, 2002, at ROH's Crowning a Champion event. Originally called the ROH Championship, the title was renamed to the ROH World Championship in May 2003 after the title was defended outside the United States for the first time—earlier that month, then-champion Samoa Joe had defeated The Zebra Kid in London, England, at the Frontiers of Honor event co-promoted with the Frontier Wrestling Alliance. On August 12, 2006, the ROH World Championship was unified with the ROH Pure Championship after then-champion Bryan Danielson defeated ROH Pure Champion Nigel McGuinness in Liverpool, England. The Pure Championship was deactivated after this match.

ROH World Championship reigns are determined by professional wrestling matches, in which competitors are involved in scripted rivalries. These narratives create feuds between the various competitors, which cast them as villains and heroes. Some reigns were held by champions using a ring name, while others used their real name. Reigns that were won on pay-per-view events aired on tape delay up to weeks or months apart. Reigns that were won at live events were released on DVD. The inaugural champion was Low Ki, whom ROH recognized to have become the champion after defeating Christopher Daniels, Spanky, and Doug Williams in a four-way 60-minuted Iron Man match on July 27, 2002, at ROH's Crowning a Champion event.

Adam Cole holds the record for most reigns, with three. Jay Lethal has the most defenses, with 41; Kyle O'Reilly has the least, with 0. At 645 days, Samoa Joe's reign is the longest in the title's history; Kyle O'Reilly's reign is the shortest at 33 days. Claudio Castagnoli is the current champion in his second reign. He defeated Chris Jericho on December 10, 2022 at Final Battle in Arlington, Texas.

Title history

Names

Reigns

Combined reigns

Notes 
 1. – This event was a live event that was later released on DVD.
 2. – This event was a pay-per-view that later aired on tape delay.
 3. – Each reign is ranked highest to lowest; reigns with the exact number mean they are tied for that certain rank.

References 
 General
 
 
 

 Specific

External links 
  ROH World Title History at Cagematch.net

Ring of Honor championships
ROH World Championship